Laure Duthilleul (born 14 January 1959) is a French actress, director and screenwriter. She has appeared in more than 70 films and television shows since 1981. She has appeared in five films that have been screened at the Cannes Film Festival. She is the daughter of French architect Jean Duthilleul and the sister of Jean-Marie Duthilleul.

Filmography

Actress

Filmmaker

Theater

References

External links

1959 births
Living people
French film actresses
People from Versailles
20th-century French actresses
21st-century French actresses
French television actresses
French stage actresses
French women film directors
French women screenwriters
French screenwriters